A Village Affair is a 1989 romance novel by English author Joanna Trollope. Published by Bloomsbury, the story concerns an unhappy young wife and mother, Alice Jordan, whose friendship with a young and independent woman, Clodagh Unwin, becomes a love affair. It was published in the United States by Harper & Row.

Plot
"The Grey House is the final piece in the jigsaw of Alice Jordan's perfect life. It seems to be the ultimate achievement of her outwardly happy marriage - a loyal, if dull husband, three children, two cars and now the house. So why does she feel as if something is missing? As Alice and her family settle themselves into village life the something missing becomes something huge and then breaks, scandalizing the village, opening up old wounds. But because of it, Alice begins to feel that there is hope and humour and understanding and compassion in the new life she must build for herself." — Joanna Trollope

Film
A Village Affair was adapted as a television film and broadcast by ITV on 17 April 1995.

References

External links
 
 
  A Village Affair at Warner Sisters

1989 British novels
English novels
Novels by Joanna Trollope